The Algerian passport is an international travel document issued to citizens of Algeria, and may also serve as proof of Algerian citizenship. Besides enabling the bearer to travel internationally and serving as indication of Algerian citizenship, the passport facilitates the process of securing assistance from Algerian consular officials abroad. 

The passport costs 6,000 DZD ($30) and is valid for 10 years.

Biometric passport
Biometric passports started to be issued on January 5, 2012.

Physical appearance
The data page of the passport is from rigid polycarbonate plastic and contains a microchip embedded in which are stored biometric data of the holder including fingerprints, photo and signature. The data is extracted from the chip with wireless RFID technology.

The photo on the page can be scanned and is replied by side and it is UV reactive. It has an alphanumeric code at the bottom of the data page which is machine-readable with optical scanners. The code includes microprinting, holographic images, images visible only with UV light, filigree and other details.

The data is written in Arabic, English and French.

Visa requirements

Algerian citizens have visa-free or visa on arrival access to 50 countries and territories, ranking it 91st in the world according to the Henley Passport Index Q1 2022. It is also ranked 50th, out of 67th, according to the Arton Capital's Passport Index.

See also
 Visa requirements for Algerian citizens

References

Law of Algeria
Algeria
Government of Algeria